Jr. Philharmonic Orchestra of California is one of the oldest youth orchestras in the United States. It was founded in Los Angeles, California, on January 22, 1937, by Ernst Katz. The Jr. Philharmonic is a non-commercial venture. From its inception, it has been a family-run orchestra.

Motto and mission 
Ernst Katz, a piano prodigy, founded his youth orchestra in East Los Angeles in 1937. Throughout his life, he spread his philosophy and motto "Give Youth A Chance To Be Heard" to more than 70,000 young people.

See also 
 List of youth orchestras in the United States

References

External links 

 Official website

1937 establishments in California
American youth orchestras
Arts organizations established in 1937
Musical groups established in 1937
Musical groups from Los Angeles
Music of Los Angeles
Non-profit organizations based in Los Angeles
Orchestras based in California